The Men's 100 Breaststroke event at the 10th FINA World Aquatics Championships swam on 20–21 July 2003 in Barcelona, Spain. Preliminary and Semifinal heats swam on 20 July, with the Final on 21 July.

At the start of the event, the existing World (WR) and Championship (CR) records were both:
WR & CR: 59.94 swum by Roman Sloudnov (Russia) on 23 July 2001 in Fukuoka, Japan

Results

Final

Semifinals

Preliminaries

References

Swimrankings.net

Swimming at the 2003 World Aquatics Championships